İkinci Çaylı (also, Çaylı, Chayly, and Chayly Vtoryye) is a village and municipality in the Shamakhi Rayon of Azerbaijan.  It has a population of 510.

References 

Populated places in Shamakhi District